Kai Tak Cruise Terminal is a cruise ship terminal on the former Kai Tak Airport runway in Hong Kong. Its completion date was delayed into 2013 due to re-tendering. Following an international competition, Foster + Partners was chosen to design the cruise terminal. The first ship berthed on 12 June 2013.

The Government announced that it would focus on the development of a new cruise terminal at Kai Tak development area to help Hong Kong become a regional transport hub for cruise ships. It was built by Dragages Hong Kong Limited and site formation was completed by Penta-Ocean Construction Company.

History and development
Between 2001 and 2005, some 11 cruise vessels had to berth mid-stream and at container terminals because Ocean Terminal could not meet market demand.

Hong Kong's Secretary for Economic Development, Stephen Ip, said Hong Kong needs an additional berths between 2009 and 2015, and one to two more berths beyond 2015 to capture the growth of the regional cruise market.
 Support facilities – located mainly in the cruise terminal building, such as customs, immigration, quarantine counters, and 20 baggage handling areas; and,

The Government at first adopted a market-driven approach in the new development.

A pre-tender consultation with relevant trades was conducted in the first half of next year to expedite the pace of development, followed by invitation of tenders in the fourth quarter. The tender was to be awarded in the second quarter of 2008. The estimated development cost, excluding that for the commercial area, was about $2.4 billion HKD.

Tender
The Hong Kong Special Administrative Region Government issued an open tender on 9 November 2007 for the development of the new cruise terminal.

On 9 July 2008, the Secretary for Commerce & Economic Development Frederick Ma announced that the Kai Tak cruise development project will be re-tendered as submissions received in the previous exercise did not conform with requirements. Ma said two submissions were received in the previous tendering exercise which closed in March. One submission called for hotel rooms to be individually sold off, while the other asked to develop more commercial area.

Subject to lawmakers' approval, the Government will re-tender the site by year's end, aiming to award the tender by the third quarter of 2009. The first berth of the new cruise terminal was expected to begin operation by the second quarter of 2013.

Construction
The Government wanted to seek lawmakers' approval to fund the site formation works and facilities required for the provision of government services in the fourth quarter of 2008. At that time, the estimated cost ranges from $1.8 billion to $2 billion.

The Civil Engineering & Development Department awarded a $407 million contract for stage-one infrastructure works at the former Kai Tak Airport on 2 September 2009. Works started on 4 September for completion in four years. The contract comprises the construction of a -long two-lane road, associated drainage, sewerage and water works, and a fireboat berth and public landing steps. The works will provide infrastructure to serve the early development of the southern part of the former runway area, which includes the first cruise terminal berth and a park. The works have been designed by AECOM Asia which will also supervise construction.

Permanent Secretary for Development (Works), Mak Chai-kwong, and the Managing Director of Dragages Hong Kong Limited, Nicolas Borit, signed a design and build contract for the Kai Tak Cruise Terminal Building on 8 May 2010. The first berth was to be commissioned in mid-2013 and was to be capable of accommodating the world's largest cruise vessels.  The second berth was to commence operation in 2014 for berthing medium-sized cruise vessels. The second berth will be ready from early 2016.

Architectural design
The cruise terminal was designed by architects Foster + Partners. The terminal currently has the capacity to disembark a total of 8,400 (peak design load) or 5400 (base design load) passengers and 1,200 crew and its design also anticipates the demands of a new generation of larger cruise liners currently being designed. The interior, which spans , can be converted into a venue for performances, events and exhibitions, supported by the terminal's restaurants and shops. This flexibility ensures that the building will be used all year round and can fully utilize down time. The sustainable design combines a number of energy-saving measures, and will generate power from renewable sources, as well as making use of recycled rain water for cooling.

The design, routing and functionality of the new terminal are based on the much smaller Passenger Terminal Amsterdam (PTA) in Amsterdam, the Netherlands. Partner in the Bouygues-led consortium which won the tender, is Amsterdam Port Consultants (APC) which consists of Haven Amsterdam, the government owner of the PTA terminal, and Ingenieursbureau Lievense, which was responsible for the design of PTA. The Dutch terminal, PTA, although smaller was chosen as a model for the new Hong Kong terminal on the basis of PTA's multifunctionality.

Operation and management
On 8 March 2012, the Worldwide Cruise Terminals Consortium was awarded the right to operate and manage the cruise terminal at Kai Tak. The consortium is required to pay the government a fixed rent of around HK$13 million for the 10-year operation. In addition, the government will receive a percentage of the operator's gross receipts as variable rent, with the percentage increasing from 7.3 percent to 34 percent as gross receipts rise. The grouping is made up of Worldwide Flight Services, Royal Caribbean Cruises and Neo Crown. Mariner of the Seas was the first cruise ship to dock at the new terminal on 12 June 2013.

Home port
Roughly 80% of the ship calls at the Kai Tak Cruise Terminal have been turnaround or 'homeporting' calls.  
The first major homeport season was by Voyager of the Seas, which was based at Kai Tak from June to October 2015.

Lines
The Kai Tak Cruise Terminal ("KTCT") commenced operation in 2013 and has since welcomed cruise ships from a wide variety or cruise lines.  Lines calling or scheduled to call at the KTCT include:
Azamara Club Cruises
AIDA Cruises
Carnival Cruise Line
Celebrity Cruises
Costa Cruises
Cruise and Maritime Voyages
Cunard
Dream Cruises
Fred.Olsen Cruise Lines
Hapag-Lloyd Cruises
Holland America
Norwegian Cruise Line
Oceania Cruises
Peace Voyages
Phoenix Reisen
Plantours Cruises
Princess Cruises
Regent Seven Seas Cruises
Royal Caribbean International
Seabourn Cruise Line
Semester at Sea
Silversea Cruises
Star Cruises
TUI Cruises
Viking Cruise Line
Voyages of Discovery
Windstar.

Year-on-year development

* confirmed bookings as of Jan 2018

Passenger numbers based on ship’s declarations and do not include crew

References

External links

Kai Tak Cruise Terminal official website
Kai Tak Cruise Terminal, Hong Kong, 2010–2013 Foster + Partners. Retrieved 11 August 2014.
Kai Tak Cruise Terminal, Hong Kong, 2010–2013 Dragages Hong Kong Limited.

Kowloon City District
Kowloon Bay
Victoria Harbour
Piers in Hong Kong
Tourist attractions in Hong Kong
Passenger ship terminals